Neophemula is a genus of moths in the family Erebidae. It contains the single species Neophemula vitrina.

References

Natural History Museum Lepidoptera generic names catalog

Syntomini
Monotypic moth genera